The Anglo-Boer War Museum (also known as The War Museum of the Boer Republics) in Bloemfontein is the only museum in the world dedicated solely to the Anglo-Boer Wars of 1899 to 1902. The museum has a unique art collection, dioramas and exhibits but also brings the visitor closer to understanding the background against which the war took place. The National Women's Monument is at the same location.

See also 
National Women's Monument
Anglo-Boer War Memorial

References 

Military and war museums in South Africa
Second Boer War memorials